Wildcat Canyon Regional Park is a  East Bay Regional Parks District park bordering the city of Richmond in Contra Costa County in the San Francisco Bay Area of California. It includes a portion of Wildcat Canyon as well as a portion of the adjoining San Pablo Ridge, and is directly connected to the more heavily used Tilden Regional Park.

History
The area was inhabited by Native Americans until 1772 when a group of "Catalan volunteers" led by Pedro Fagas and Fray Juan Crespi came across the settlement while searching for trade routes north beyond the Carquinez Strait.  The Spanish settled the general area and by 1840 had parceled the land for missions and cattle raising coming into conflict with the historical communal practices of the Native Americans. Juan Jose and Victor Castro were given rights to all vacant land in the area. They kept some valuable lands and gave much of the land over to municipal authorities for water usage. In 1935, the East Bay Regional Parks District acquired the land that formed Tilden Park to the South and continued to acquire land to the north of Tilden until in 1976 it had sufficient land to form Wildcat Canyon Regional Park.

EBRPD announced on February 17, 2014 that it had acquired  of woodland on the east side of the park, which would be added to the park's existing 2,428 acres. The addition will allow easier access for visitors from El Sobrante and Richmond (via a planned trailhead and staging area on San Pablo Dam Road) and connects the park to the Kennedy Grove Regional Recreation Area and San Pablo Reservoir.

Flora
Wildcat has an abundance of wildlife both flora and fauna. There are coast live oak, California bay laurel, bigleaf maple, madrone, alder, willow, dogwood, and eucalyptus forests. There are humid chaparrals made up of coyote brush, poison oak, elderberry, snowberry, bracken fern, and blackberry brambles.

There are some native grasses, but non-native species like rye, barley, and oat dominate, however many kinds of native flowers are present.

Fauna
With regards to animal life there are coyotes, foxes, raccoons, skunks, opossums, deer, California ground squirrels often thought to be gophers in addition to voles present.

Reptilian life includes gopher snakes, king snakes, western racers, garter snakes, rubber boas, ringneck snakes. In the skies red-tailed hawks, American kestrels, sharp shinned hawks, cooper's hawks, ravens, and turkey vultures fly and also great horned owls and many songbirds.

Major trails

Wildcat Creek Trail - Runs along Wildcat Creek from the Alvarado Park staging area in Richmond into Tilden Park's Nature Area.  The Wildcat Park section measures 3.5 miles to the park border and continues for 1 mile to the Tilden Nature Area parking lot. The trail is wide and does not involve major elevation changes. The trail's midpoint can be accessed via Rifle Range Road Trail accessed via Rifle Range Road in El Cerrito, California.

Nimitz Way - Starting at Tilden Park's Inspiration Point, Nimitz Way (named after Admiral Chester W. Nimitz) is a mostly paved trail that connects to Wildcat Canyon Park after 1.5 miles. The Wildcat section is 2.51 miles long and connects to San Pablo Ridge Trail. Nimitz Way is a popular, relatively easy trail with views of the San Francisco Bay to the west and EBMUD's San Pablo & Briones Reservoirs and Mt. Diablo.

Belgum Trail - Accessed from Wildcat Creek Trail about 0.5 miles from the Alvarado Park staging area, it climbs quickly over a relatively short 0.85 miles to Wildcat Canyon's meadows and provides excellent views of San Francisco Bay.  The ruins of the Belgum Sanitarium and the palm trees planted by its founder, Hendrick Belgum, are visible from the trail.

San Pablo Ridge Trail - Accessed from Belgum Trail or Clark-Boas Trail, which runs from the Clark Road park entrance in Richmond, the San Pablo Ridge Trail is a short 1.43 miles but climbs over three peaks. The trail connects at its southern terminus with Nimitz Way.

Other features

Alvarado Park, a National Historic Place is the northernmost portion of Wildcat Canyon.

The  section in Wildcat Canyon Regional Park was a Nike missile base which was decommissioned in the 1970s. Today there are few signs of the missile silos and military housing that used to populate these hills.

Wildcat Canyon Regional Park hosts cattle who graze the hills of the park under a grazing program managed by the East Bay Regional Parks District.

Accessing the Park
The park can be accessed via the following entry points:
The main entrance and park office is the Alvarado Park area on Park Avenue in Richmond reached from McBryde Avenue.
The Clark Road entrance in the northernmost area of the park is accessed off of San Pablo Dam Road.
Rifle Range Road in El Cerrito
Leisure Lane off of San Pablo Dam Road

References

External links
 Wildcat Canyon Regional Park at the East Bay Regional Parks District website
 Park Information and Trail Map  from East Bay Regional Parks District website

Parks in Contra Costa County, California
Parks in Richmond, California
Berkeley Hills
East Bay Regional Park District
Bay Area Ridge Trail